NGC 2787 is a barred lenticular galaxy approximately 24 million light-years away in the northern constellation of Ursa Major. It was discovered on December 3, 1788 by German-born astronomer William Herschel. J. L. E. Dreyer described it as, "bright, pretty large, a little extended 90°, much brighter middle, mottled but not resolved, very small (faint) star involved to the southeast".

This galaxy is small and isolated with a morphological classification of  SB(r)0+, which indicates a barred spiral (SB) with a ring around the bar (r). Being a lenticular galaxy, it has the large halo of an elliptical galaxy. The galaxy has an unusually high mass-to-light ratio, much greater than for a typical spiral galaxy. This ring appears misaligned with the central disk.

NGC 2787 contains a low-ionization nuclear emission-line region (LINER) at its core, which is a type of region that is characterized by its spectral line emission from weakly ionized atoms. LINERs are very common within lenticular galaxies, with approximately one-fifth of nearby lenticular galaxies containing LINERs. The central region of the galaxy contains dust rings that are tilted with respect to the disk, which may be the result of an encounter with another galaxy.

References

External links
 
 A Galaxy That's All Wound Up
 NGC 2787 at ESA/Hubble

Lenticular galaxies
Barred lenticular galaxies
LINER galaxies
Ursa Major (constellation)
2787
04914
26341